NMB Bank, is a commercial bank in Tanzania.  It is licensed by the Bank of Tanzania, the central bank and national banking regulator.

, the bank was a large financial services institution, providing commercial banking services to individuals, small to medium-sized corporate clients, as well as large businesses. Then, it was the third-largest commercial bank in Tanzania, by assets, behind FBME Bank and CRDB Bank.

, the bank's total asset valuation was about TSh 4.72 trillion (US$2.212 billion).

History
Following the break-up of the old National Bank of Commerce in 1997, by act of Parliament, three new entities were created: (a) NBC Holdings Limited (b) National Bank of Tanzania (1997) and (c) National Microfinance Bank.  Initially NMB could only offer savings accounts, with limited lending capabilities.

In 2005, NMB Bank was privatized and the Government of Tanzania, the sole owner of NMB until then, divested 49% shareholding to Rabobank of the Netherlands. Over the years since that time, further divestiture by the Tanzanian Government and subsequent listing of the bank's stock has led to a diversified ownership structure, as outlined under "Ownership".

Ownership
The stock of the bank is listed on the Dar es Salaam Stock Exchange, under the stock symbol NMB. The company's stock is owned by institutions and private individuals as detailed in the table below:

Branch Network
, the bank maintains over 185 networked branches in all regions and provinces of Tanzania.

See also
 Tanzania Banks
 National Bank of Commerce (Tanzania)
 Economy of Tanzania
 Microfinance in Tanzania

Register For NMB Mkononi

References

Banks of Tanzania
Companies of Tanzania
Banks established in 1997
Dar es Salaam
Companies listed on the Dar es Salaam Stock Exchange
Economy of Tanzania
1997 establishments in Tanzania
Tanzanian brands